Alfred Nzo is one of the 6 districts of Eastern Cape province of South Africa. The seat of Alfred Nzo is Mount Ayliff. The majority of its 801 344 people speak Xhosa. The district code is DC44.

It is named after Alfred Baphethuxolo Nzo, a former secretary-general of the African National Congress and minister of foreign affairs in Nelson Mandela's cabinet from 1994 to 1999.

Geography
The Alfred Nzo District Municipality contains the following towns: Mount Frere, Mount Ayliff, Maluti and Matatiele. It is the smallest and one of the poorest districts in the province.

Neighbours
Alfred Nzo is surrounded by:
 the kingdom of Lesotho to the north
 Harry Gwala District (DC43) to the north-east
 Ugu District (DC21) to the east
 OR Tambo District (DC15) to the south
 Joe Gqabi District (DC14) to the west

Local municipalities
The district contains the following local municipalities:

After the 2011 municipal election, Alfred Nzo District was expanded by including Mbizana Local Municipality and Ntabankulu Local Municipality, previously part of OR Tambo District Municipality.

Demographics
The following statistics are from the 2011 census.

Languages

Gender

Ethnic group

Age

Politics

Election results
Election results for Alfred Nzo in the South African general election, 2004.
 Population 18 and over: 260 501 [70% of total population]
 Total votes: 172 001 [31.25% of total population]
 Voting % estimate: 66.03% votes as a % of population 18 and over

References

External links
 Official website

District municipalities of the Eastern Cape
Alfred Nzo District Municipality